Rhaeboscelis is a genus of beetles in the family Buprestidae, containing the following species:

 Rhaeboscelis chalybea (Gory, 1841)
 Rhaeboscelis purpurea Chevrolat, 1838

References

Buprestidae genera